Football Manager (also known as Worldwide Soccer Manager in North America from 2004 to 2008) is a series of football management simulation video games developed by British developer Sports Interactive and published by Sega. The game began its life in 1992 as Championship Manager. However, following the break-up of their partnership with original publishers Eidos Interactive, triggered by the "fiasco" release of CM4 in 2003, Sports Interactive lost the naming rights to Eidos Interactive, but retained the game engine and data and re-branded the game Football Manager with their new publisher Sega. The latest version of Football Manager, titled Football Manager 2023, was released on 8 November 2022.

Main series

Football Manager 2005

On 12 February 2004, after splitting from publishers Eidos Interactive, it was announced that Sports Interactive, developers of the Championship Manager game, had retained the rights to the source code but not the rights to the title Championship Manager, which were held onto by Eidos (who previously acquired the brand rights from Domark upon their merger in 1995). These developments led to a further announcement that future Sports Interactive football management games would be released under the famous Football Manager brand name. Whilst the Championship Manager series would go on, Eidos no longer had any source code, or, indeed a developer for Championship Manager.

Having been left without a publisher for its football management series, Sports Interactive teamed up with Sega and later, in April 2006, Sports Interactive was acquired completely by the publisher in a continuing trend of consolidation within the games industry. The first game released under the newly acquired Football Manager brand was Football Manager 2005. Commonly known as "FM 2005", it competed directly with Championship Manager 5 from Eidos-funded Beautiful Game Studios.

Football Manager 2005 included an updated user interface, a refined game engine, updated database and competition rules, pre and post-match information, international player news, cup summary news, a 2D match engine, coach reports on squads, jobcentre for non-playing positions, mutual contract termination, enhanced player loan options, manager "mind games" and various other features.

Football Manager 2005 was released in the UK on 5 November 2004 – closely followed by releases in many other countries around the world – and it became the 5th fastest-selling PC game of all time (according to Eurogamer). The Macintosh version of the game came on the same dual format disk as the Windows version, so its sales were also included.

Football Manager 2006

Football Manager 2006 for Windows and Mac OS was released in the UK on 21 October 2005 (2 weeks earlier than the originally stated 4 November release). On the same day as the game's release, Sports Interactive also released a patch to fix some bugs discovered during the Beta and Gold stages of development. In its first week of release, it became the second-fastest-selling PC game of all-time in the UK.

Essentially a season update of FM 2005, it does however, include many small adjustments and improvements to the general gameplay. These adjustments include team-talks, simplified training and in-game help screens. As well as this, the game is updated by its many researchers (unpaid fans of the game augmented by in-house collaboration). The database is usually updated twice in the period of the release of the game. The first comes with the game and the second is usually downloadable in February as a free data update to reflect the changes which take place during the winter opening of the FIFA transfer window. As has been customary with the series a beta demo of the game was released on 12 September 2005. This was later followed on 30 September by a gold demo. This is a cut-down, limited time version of the full game which is sent to the game manufacturers. With a special download from Sports Interactive, one can play as the fictional football team, Harchester United from Sky One's series Dream Team.

Football Manager 2006 – Xbox 360
The Xbox 360 version was released on 13 April 2006 and is the first home console game in the Football Manager series. The full 50 playable league systems are included, as well as a 250,000-strong player database (very near to the figure of the PC version), but due to the large save files of the game, the Xbox hard disk drive is required. The game is also region free.

This version also makes use of the Xbox Live functionality, allowing players to create online leagues and cups with up to 16 human-controlled teams using team data they have exported from their offline game. Voice chat is fully supported during online play. It has also been confirmed that SI will release new content through the Marketplace system.

Football Manager 2007

On 8 June 2006, Sports Interactive published details on Football Manager 2007. On 1 October 2006, Sports Interactive released a Gold Demo of FM 2007, available in two versions, vanilla and strawberry. Both versions allow users to play six months into a season. The strawberry version contains a larger collection of quickstarts so users can try out more leagues. It also contains more graphics than the vanilla version. Football Manager 2007 was released on 18 October 2006.

New features in the 2007 version of FM include the ability to include pictures for the player as the manager; substantially increased media interaction such as approaches from national newspaper journalists about the upcoming match or asking for comments on a player's performance in recent matches; new varying degrees of criticism or praise for players (happy with form or very pleased with form rather than just one generic good term), a similar feature has been included for such actions as admiring players or attempting to unsettle transfer targets. Improvements have also been made to board request interactions.

The main improvement lauded by Sports Interactive for this version of FM is the improved scouting system. Scouts' and coaches' experience is now shown graphically via bar charts and scouts gain knowledge from areas they have scouted previously. To go with this it is now possible to get feeder/parent club status which allows to either send players to lower league teams to gain experience, make it easier to get work permits, merchandise sales in other areas etc. or, as a lower league team, to receive reserve and youth team players on free, season long loans and to generate extra revenue through associated 'fees' and friendly matches. A patch has been released to combat some of the main bugs in the game, such as unrealistic scout reports and high amounts of injuries sustained whilst playing on the pitch. On 27 July, the Football Manager website was updated with a new Football Manager 2008 section.

Football Manager 2008

On 3 October 2007 Sega Europe Ltd and Sports Interactive announced Football Manager 2008 to be released 19 October. However, the release date was brought forward by a day to 18 October 2007, due to some retailers shipping the game early.

There were a number of new features: all features in matches seamlessly follow on from the previous one; a mini radar pitch appears during tactical changes; improved International management; new skin; advisor system; improved notebook system; a revamped captain selection; improved board and fan confidence system; transfer centre to track transfers; improved match engine; the player may change pitch dimensions; award system overhaul; in-game all-time best elevens; a revamped finance system; collective win bonuses; FaceGen system for new-gen players; new calendar.

Football Manager 2009

On 3 September 2008, Sports Interactive released a preview video announcing Football Manager 2009 to be released on 14 November. The main difference from past versions was the inclusion of a 3D match engine for the first time in the game's history. Other new features included the ability to have female managers and staff, a new press conference system, more in-depth feedback from assistant manager and a more realistic transfer system. The latest incarnation of Football Manager was also released in DVD format for the first time.

The use of online-activation DRM utilised by Sports Interactive resulted in issues for consumers activating either online, or phone. This was the result of a well orchestrated DDoS attack launched upon activation servers and phone lines, resulting in many users on the Windows platform unable to activate and play. mOn 17 December 2008, Sports Interactive announced a deal with Arsenal F.C. to release an exclusive version of Football Manager 2009, containing all official Arsenal squad player pictures, and an exclusive skin in Arsenal's colours. Shortly following this announcement, Sports Interactive reinforced their pursuit of online retailers by offering Football Manager 2009 through eSellerate for the Mac OS X platform on 23 December. This is the first incarnation of the game to be available to global users through online distribution.

Football Manager 2010

On 12 August 2009, Sports Interactive & Sega Europe Ltd. announced that Football Manager 2010 for PC and Apple Macintosh, and Football Manager Handheld 2010 for PlayStation Portable was to be released on 30 October 2009.
Include Competitions: Challenge Cup and Challenge Cup qualification, Caribbean Championship Football Manager has been hugely successful, managing to gain the number 1 spot in the gaming charts. There have been many improvements made to FM10, including the following:-

 A totally revamped user interface making it simpler and quicker to find the information.
 Match Analysis tool showing the actions of each player on the pitch, allowing to pinpoint any team's strengths and weaknesses.
 Making changes from the touchline by "shouting" instructions from the touchline instantly.
 Included two new national teams, Zanzibar and Tuvalu.

Football Manager 2011

FM2011 was released on 5 November 2010. On 23 July 2010 a number of features as well as the design of the box were leaked before an official announcement could be made.

 Improved training options
 More complex module for searching new players
 Improved graphics and 3D view of the game
 Introduction of football agents to the game
 Playing games in evenings (so called night effect)
 Differentiated weather conditions

Football Manager 2012

Football Manager 2012 was released on 21 October 2011.

 Transfers & Contracts – significant changes to the transfer and contract systems
 Scouting improvements – a new much detailed in-game report has been devised
 3D Match Improvements – new animations, new crowd system, more stadiums
 Manage Anywhere, Anytime – the ability to add or take away playable nations
 Tone – new system which allows to specify the way to say things
 Intelligent Interface – a new adaptive layout system, new filters and more
 New national team – Kiribati

Football Manager 2013

In a press conference in early September, the makers of the Football Manager series revealed a few new features in Football Manager 2013.  These included the addition of a director of football, being able to give certain roles to other staff that managers would have to do themselves in previous games, taxes, a new way of making loan deals and the addition of Classic Mode where players could go through one season in eight hours without having to customize training or deal with team talk. On 28 September 2012, the release date was announced as 2 November 2012. If the game is pre-ordered, a beta version of the game will be available two weeks prior to 2 November, with any saved data being able to be transferred to the release version. New national team was included, South Sudan national football team.

Football Manager 2014

In August 2013, the Sports Interactive official website unveiled the main tweaks and upgrades to be added in "Football Manager 2014", the most noticeable being the decision to release a simultaneous version for the Linux operating system. Among the other changes announced were extended options in transfer and contract negotiations as well as player conversations, the ability to play with more than just three nations loaded in Classic Mode, a tactical overhaul and improvements to the 3D match engine. Studio Director and long-time Football Manager lead Miles Jacobson also announced that for a week in mid-August he would announce one new feature every day via his Twitter feed, the first feature being the ability to arrange testimonial matches. On 13 September 2013, the release date was announced as 31 October 2013. If the game is pre-ordered, a beta version of the game will be available two weeks prior to 31 October, with any saved data being able to be transferred to the release version.

Football Manager 2015

Football Manager 2016

Football Manager 2017

Football Manager 2018

The 2018 release introduced a "Dynamics" team morale system, which allows managers to see team hierarchies and a more in depth team cohesion rating. The scouting mechanic has also had an overhaul, with it being more lifelike, with scouts knowledge of players scaling between 0 and 100%. A Nintendo Switch version was released on 13 April 2018.

Football Manager 2019

Football Manager 2020

Football Manager 2021

Football Manager 2022

Football Manager 2023

Other games

Football Manager Mobile
Football Manager Mobile, known as Football Manager Handheld (FMH) upon inception, was first released on 13 April 2006 on PlayStation Portable. This was Sports Interactive's first ever game for a handheld console and was designed to be a separate game and play somewhat differently from the PC/Mac versions of the game due to the different nature of the handheld consoles. The game was designed to be more similar in feel and play to earlier Sports Interactive products – being much faster in nature, while retaining the feeling of being a realistic simulation.

In April 2010, the game became available on the iOS products. The iOS version of the game is very different in nature to that on the PSP and it contains a wholly new UI because of the touch screen nature of those devices. In April 2012, the game was also made available on Android devices in a version very similar in nature to the iOS version. In 2015, a new 2D match engine was introduced for iOS and Android devices, as well as an opportunity to purchase an "in-game editor". These early version of the mobile game utilized the PISD Ltd technology to target the handheld markets. The 2016 edition of the game saw its name change to Football Manager Mobile. In 2018, Football Manager Mobile was ranked #10 on paid games. In 2020, football manager mobile 2020 became the first fmm to reach 1 million downloads in all platforms.

Football Manager Live

On 20 April 2007, Sega Europe Ltd and Sports Interactive released details for Football Manager Live which would be a brand new massively multiplayer online game based on PISD Ltd technology. Released on 4 November 2008, Football Manager Live had its roots set in the Football Manager series, but was designed specifically as a massively multiplayer online game. On 12 December 2008, the first Community Day was arranged by Sports Interactive and Sega. The future of the series and many other matters were discussed with a number of fans who decided to show up for the event. On 14 April 2011, it was announced that Football Manager Live would be discontinued after all 'Gameworlds' (Servers) completed their next season (28 day period) – due around the end of May 2011.

Football Manager Online
On 12 March 2015, Sega Publishing Korea Ltd. and Sports Interactive released details for Football Manager Online, which would be a brand new massively multiplayer online game.

Sonic & All-Stars Racing Transformed
Football Manager is represented with a racer named "Football Manager" in the cross-over game, Sonic & All-Stars Racing Transformed, and is exclusive to the PC version of the game.

Influence
Football Manager has been recognized by real-life football clubs as a source for scouting players. In 2008, Everton FC signed a deal with Sports Interactive allowing them to use the game's database to scout players and opposition.

A video documentary entitled Football Manager: More Than Just A Game was produced by journalism graduate and MA student Stephen Milnes and released in October 2010. Another documentary by FilmNova entitled An Alternative Reality: The Football Manager Documentary was released in the UK cinemas in October 2014 followed by a release on Steam in March 2015.

Football Manager celebrated its twentieth birthday in the summer of 2012, and to celebrate this milestone Back Page Press released a book including interviews with the creators and players that became legends in-game. Another part of the book will include stories about how the game has taken over one's life.

In November 2012, Azerbaijani student Vugar Huseynzade was promoted to manager of FC Baku's reserve team based on his success in Football Manager.

In 2013, stand-up comedian Tony Jameson performed a show called Football Manager Ruined My Life; it was well received at the Edinburgh Festival, before going on to have a successful touring run, culminating in the show being filmed and released on DVD and Steam.

In the 2000s, an anonymous player of Football Manager tipped the Philippine Football Federation regarding the eligibility of Phil and James Younghusband to play for the Philippines men's national football team through the video game. In 2005, the brothers who were then part of the Chelsea youth program were successfully called up to the national team. Phil Younghusband would later become the top goalscorer for the Philippines with at least 50 goals credited to his name.

In 2020, a part-time Football Manager researcher discovered Blackburn Rovers forward Ben Brereton was half-Chilean via a club interview from 2018 and added Brereton's second nationality to the game database. Brereton would regularly be called up by the Chile national team in the Football Manager 2021 game, which prompted interest from a Chilean Football Manager streamer. Brereton received encouragement from Chile head coach Reinaldo Rueda and began the application process for a Chilean passport. Martín Lasarte, who succeeded Rueda in February 2021, called up the Rovers forward for the first time in May that year. He was an unused substitute in Chile's two World Cup qualification fixtures in June before making his debut as a substitute in the Copa América against Argentina.

Belgian manager Will Still credits the game as part of his influence to become a manager whilst playing for Sint-Truiden 's youth set up, before taking up assistant ro les with Preston North End , Lierse and eventually becoming  manager of Beerschot , leading them to a 9th place finish in First Division A . Still took over the role of Manager of French Ligue 1 side Reims , in which became notable in the news due to the fact Still has yet to receive his UEFA Pro License, a requirement for the French top division, however with the club performing well, including a fair set of results against the likes of PSG and Olympique Lyon, the chairman of Reims is happy to be fined per match while the club continued their good form.

Football Manager in academic work 
Championship Manager has been the object of a sociological study where it is concluded that not only football culture is essential to fully live the gaming experience, but also gamers build their sporting identity by playing the game. Other media like films are described as providing only restrictive narratives to the sports fans, while in contrast, sports video games in general and Football Manager in particular provide more fluid narratives, and a wealth of information that helps construct the identity of the football fan, beyond sport itself.

The Football Manager gaming online community has been studied as a workforce to co-construct the crowdsourced database of football players that the game relies on to simulate football matches and careers. The mutual influence of the game and real life football is described as twofold. First, database players simulated potential and real life transfer market activity are mutually shaping each other. The other mutual influence highlighted are the real life football and game metrics that quantify and measure the footballing activity.

See also
Sports management games

References

External links 
Official website
5 Experts Give Their Opinion on Football Manager 2013
Beginner's guide – Let's play Football Manager

 
Association football management video games
Classic Mac OS games
Multiplayer and single-player video games
Sega Games franchises
Video games developed in the United Kingdom
Video game franchises introduced in 2004
Windows games